This article provides a comparison of Business Process Model and Notation (BPMN) tools.

General

References

Business process modelling
Software comparisons